Anna María Birulés i Bertrán (born 28 June 1954) is a Spanish politician and businesswoman. She served as Minister of Science and Technology of Spain from April 2000 to July 2002.

References

1954 births
Living people
University of Barcelona alumni
Government ministers of Spain